Horovitz is one of the variants of a surname originating in the Jewish community of Bohemia – bearers of that surname apparently migrated in the middle ages from a small town Hořovice in Bohemia (today the Czech Republic). For detailed historical background see the Horowitz page. It can also be a non-Jewish surname as well.

It may refer to:

Ad-Rock (born 1966), stage name of Adam Horovitz of the Beastie Boys
Adam Horovitz (poet) (born 1971), British poet
Béla Horovitz (1898–1955), Hungarian-born British publisher
David Horovitz (born 1962), an author and political commentator (cousin of Alex Horovitz)
Frances Horovitz (1938–1983) English poet and broadcaster
Gillian Horovitz (born 1955), English long-distance runner
Hannah Horovitz (1936–2010), British classical music promoter
Israel Horovitz (1939–2020), American playwright and screenwriter
Joseph Horovitz (1926–2022), Austrian-English composer
Michael Horovitz (1935–2021), English poet
Robert Horovitz (born 1947), a medical biologist and Nobel Prize winner

See also 
Horowitz
Horvitz
Horwitz 
Hurvitz
Hurwitz

Jewish surnames
Surnames of Czech origin
Yiddish-language surnames